Young State Park is a public recreation area near Boyne City, Michigan, occupying  on the eastern shore of  Lake Charlevoix in Charlevoix County in the northwest of Northern Michigan.

History
Young State Park was among 13 parks established in 1920 following the creation of the Michigan State Parks Commission a year earlier. The park is named after Adolph and Mary Young, residents of Charlevoix, who donated land for the park's creation. The Civilian Conservation Corps made improvements during the 1930s.

Activities and amenities
The state park offers swimming, picnicking, five miles of hiking trails, cross-country skiing, boat launch, fishing for lake, brown and rainbow trout, and three campgrounds.

References

External links

Young State Park Michigan Department of Natural Resources
Young State Park Map Michigan Department of Natural Resources

Campgrounds in the United States
Protected areas of Charlevoix County, Michigan
State parks of Michigan
Civilian Conservation Corps in Michigan
Protected areas established in 1920
1920 establishments in Michigan
IUCN Category III